Steven Weinberg (May 3, 1933 – July 23, 2021) was an American theoretical physicist and Nobel laureate in physics for his contributions with Abdus Salam and Sheldon Glashow to the unification of the weak force and electromagnetic interaction between elementary particles.

He held the Josey Regental Chair in Science at the University of Texas at Austin, where he was a member of the Physics and Astronomy Departments. His research on elementary particles and physical cosmology was honored with numerous prizes and awards, including the 1979 Nobel Prize in physics and the 1991 National Medal of Science. In 2004, he received the Benjamin Franklin Medal of the American Philosophical Society, with a citation that said he was "considered by many to be the preeminent theoretical physicist alive in the world today." He was elected to the U.S. National Academy of Sciences, Britain's Royal Society, the American Philosophical Society, and the American Academy of Arts and Sciences.

Weinberg's articles on various subjects occasionally appeared in The New York Review of Books and other periodicals. He served as a consultant at the U.S. Arms Control and Disarmament Agency, president of the Philosophical Society of Texas, and member of the Board of Editors of Daedalus magazine, the Council of Scholars of the Library of Congress, the JASON group of defense consultants, and many other boards and committees.

Early life
Steven Weinberg was born in 1933 in New York City. His parents were Jewish immigrants; his father, Frederick, worked as a court stenographer, while his mother, Eva (Israel), was a housewife. Becoming interested in science at age 16 through a chemistry set handed down by a cousin, he graduated from Bronx High School of Science in 1950. He was in the same graduating class as Sheldon Glashow, whose research, independent of Weinberg's, resulted in their (and Abdus Salam's) sharing the 1979 Nobel in physics.

Weinberg received his bachelor's degree from Cornell University in 1954. There he resided at the Telluride House. He then went to the Niels Bohr Institute in Copenhagen, where he started his graduate studies and research. After one year, Weinberg moved to Princeton University, where he earned his Ph.D. in physics in 1957, completing his dissertation, "The role of strong interactions in decay processes", under the supervision of Sam Treiman.

Career and research
After completing his Ph.D., Weinberg worked as a postdoctoral researcher at Columbia University (1957–59) and University of California, Berkeley (1959) and then was promoted to faculty at Berkeley (1960–66). He did research in a variety of topics of particle physics, such as the high energy behavior of quantum field theory, symmetry breaking, pion scattering, infrared photons and quantum gravity. It was also during this time that he developed the approach to quantum field theory described in the first chapters of his book The Quantum Theory of Fields and started to write his textbook Gravitation and Cosmology, having taken up an interest in general relativity after the discovery of cosmic microwave background radiation. He was also appointed the senior scientist at the Smithsonian Astrophysical Observatory. The Quantum Theory of Fields spanned three volumes and over 1,500 pages, and is often regarded as the leading book in the field.

In 1966, Weinberg left Berkeley and accepted a lecturer position at Harvard. In 1967 he was a visiting professor at MIT. It was in that year at MIT that Weinberg proposed his model of unification of electromagnetism and nuclear weak forces (such as those involved in beta-decay and kaon-decay), with the masses of the force-carriers of the weak part of the interaction being explained by spontaneous symmetry breaking. One of its fundamental aspects was the prediction of the existence of the Higgs boson. Weinberg's model, now known as the electroweak unification theory, had the same symmetry structure as that proposed by Glashow in 1961: both included the then-unknown weak interaction mechanism between leptons, known as neutral current and mediated by the Z boson. The 1973 experimental discovery of weak neutral currents (mediated by this Z boson) was one verification of the electroweak unification. The paper by Weinberg in which he presented this theory is one of the most cited works ever in high-energy physics.

After his 1967 seminal work on the unification of weak and electromagnetic interactions, Weinberg continued his work in many aspects of particle physics, quantum field theory, gravity, supersymmetry, superstrings and cosmology. In the years after 1967, the full Standard Model of elementary particle theory was developed through the work of many contributors. In it, the weak and electromagnetic interactions already unified by the work of Weinberg, Salam and Glashow, are made consistent with a theory of the strong interactions between quarks, in one overarching theory. In 1973, Weinberg proposed a modification of the Standard Model that did not contain that model's fundamental Higgs boson. Also during the 1970s, he proposed a theory later known as technicolor, in which new strong interactions resolve the hierarchy problem.

Weinberg became Eugene Higgins Professor of Physics at Harvard University in 1973, a post he held until 1983. In 1979 he pioneered the modern view on the renormalization aspect of quantum field theory that considers all quantum field theories effective field theories and changed the viewpoint of previous work (including his own in his 1967 paper) that a sensible quantum field theory must be renormalizable. This approach allowed the development of effective theory of quantum gravity, low energy QCD, heavy quark effective field theory and other developments, and is a topic of considerable interest in current research.

In 1979, some six years after the experimental discovery of the neutral currents—i.e. the discovery of the inferred existence of the Z boson—but after the 1978 experimental discovery of the theory's predicted amount of parity violation due to Z bosons' mixing with electromagnetic interactions, Weinberg was awarded the Nobel Prize in physics with Glashow and Salam, who had independently proposed a theory of electroweak unification based on spontaneous symmetry breaking.

In 1982 Weinberg moved to the University of Texas at Austin as the Jack S. Josey-Welch Foundation Regents Chair in Science, and started a theoretical physics group at the university that now has eight full professors and is one of the leading research groups in the field in the U.S.

Weinberg is frequently listed among the top scientists with the highest research effect indices, such as the h-index and the creativity index. The theoretical physicist Peter Woit called Weinberg "arguably the dominant figure in theoretical particle physics during its period of great success from the late sixties to the early eighties", calling his contribution to electroweak unification "to this day at the center of the Standard Model, our best understanding of fundamental physics". Science News named him along with fellow theorists Murray Gell-Mann and Richard Feynman the leading physicists of the era, commenting, "Among his peers, Weinberg was one of the most respected figures in all of physics or perhaps all of science". Sean Carroll called Weinberg one of the “best physicists we had; one of the best thinkers of any variety” who “exhibited extraordinary verve and clarity of thought through the whole stretch of a long and productive life”, while John Preskill called him "one of the most accomplished scientists of our age, and a particularly eloquent spokesperson for the scientific worldview". Brian Greene said that Weinberg had an “astounding ability to see into the deep workings of nature” that “profoundly shaped our understanding of the universe". Upon the awarding of the Breakthrough Prize in 2020, one of the founders of the prizes, Yuri Milner, called Weinberg a “key architect” of “one of the most successful physical theories ever”, while string theorist Juan Maldacena, the chair of the selection committee, said, “Steven Weinberg has developed many of the key theoretical tools that we use for the description of nature at a fundamental level".

Other contributions
Besides his scientific research, Weinberg was a public spokesman for science, testifying before Congress in support of the Superconducting Super Collider, writing articles for The New York Review of Books, and giving various lectures on the larger meaning of science. His books on science written for the public combine the typical scientific popularization with what is traditionally considered history and philosophy of science and atheism. His first popular science book, The First Three Minutes: A Modern View of the Origin of the Universe (1977), described the start of the universe with the Big Bang and enunciated a case for its expansion.

Although still teaching physics, in later years he turned his hand to the history of science, efforts that culminated in To Explain the World: The Discovery of Modern Science (2015). A hostile review in the Wall Street Journal by Steven Shapin attracted a number of commentaries, a response by Weinberg, and an exchange of views between Weinberg and Arthur Silverstein in the NYRB in February 2016.

In 2016, Weinberg became a default leader for faculty and students opposed to a new law allowing the carrying of concealed guns in UT classrooms. He announced that he would prohibit guns in his classes, and said he would stand by his decision to violate university regulations in this matter even if faced with a lawsuit. Weinberg never retired and taught at UT until his death.

Personal life
In 1954 Weinberg married Louise Goldwasser and they had a daughter, Elizabeth. Louise Weinberg went on to become a law professor at the University of Texas.

Weinberg died on July 23, 2021, at age 88 at a hospital in Austin, where he had been undergoing treatment for several weeks.

Worldview
Weinberg identified as a liberal.

Views on religion
Weinberg was an atheist. Before he was an advocate of the Big Bang theory, Weinberg stated: "The steady-state theory is philosophically the most attractive theory because it least resembles the account given in Genesis."

Views on Israel
Weinberg was known for his support of Israel, which he characterized as "the 'most exposed salient' in a war between liberal democracies and Muslim theocracies." He wrote the 1997 essay "Zionism and Its Adversaries" on the issue.

In the 2000s, Weinberg canceled trips to universities in the United Kingdom because of the British boycotts of Israel. At the time, he explained: "Given the history of the attacks on Israel and the oppressiveness and aggressiveness of other countries in the Middle East and elsewhere, boycotting Israel indicated a moral blindness for which it is hard to find any explanation other than antisemitism."

Honors and awards

 Honorary Doctor of Science degrees from eleven institutions: University of Chicago, Knox College, University of Rochester, Yale University, City University of New York, Dartmouth College, Weizmann Institute, Clark University, Washington College, Columbia University, Bates College.
 American Academy of Arts and Sciences, elected 1968
 Fellow of the American Physical Society, elected 1971
 National Academy of Sciences, elected 1972
 J. Robert Oppenheimer Memorial Prize, 1973
Richtmyer Memorial Award (1974)
 Dannie Heineman Prize for Mathematical Physics, 1977
 Steel Foundation Science Writing Award, 1977, for writing The First Three Minutes 
 Elliott Cresson Medal (Franklin Institute), 1979
 Nobel Prize in Physics, 1979
 Elected a Foreign Member of the Royal Society (ForMemRS) in 1981
 Elected to American Philosophical Society (1982)
 James Madison Medal of Princeton University, 1991
 National Medal of Science, 1991
 President of the  Philosophical Society of Texas, 1992
 Lewis Thomas Prize for Writing about Science, 1999
 Humanist of the Year, American Humanist Association, 2002
 Benjamin Franklin Medal for Distinguished Achievement in the Sciences, American Philosophical Society, 2004
 James Joyce Award, University College Dublin, 2009
 Breakthrough Prize, 2020

Selected publications
A list of Weinberg's publications can be found on arXiv and Scopus.

Bibliography: books authored / coauthored
 Gravitation and Cosmology: Principles and Applications of the General Theory of Relativity (1972)
 The First Three Minutes: A Modern View of the Origin of the Universe (1977, updated with new afterword in 1993)
 The Discovery of Subatomic Particles (1983)
 Elementary Particles and the Laws of Physics: The 1986 Dirac Memorial Lectures (1987; with Richard Feynman)
 Dreams of a Final Theory: The Search for the Fundamental Laws of Nature  (1993), 
 The Quantum Theory of Fields (three volumes: I Foundations 1995, II Modern Applications 1996, III Supersymmetry 2000, Cambridge University Press)
 Facing Up: Science and Its Cultural Adversaries (2001, 2003, HUP)
 Glory and Terror: The Coming Nuclear Danger (2004, NYRB)
 Cosmology (2008, OUP)
 Lake Views: This World and the Universe (2010), Belknap Press of Harvard University Press,  .
 Lectures on Quantum Mechanics (2012, second edition 2015, CUP)
 To Explain the World: The Discovery of Modern Science (2015), Harper/HarperCollins Publishers, 
 Third Thoughts (2018), Belknap Press, 
 Lectures on Astrophysics (2019, CUP)
 Foundations of Modern Physics (2021, CUP)

Scholarly articles

Weinberg, S. & G. Feinberg. "Law of Conservation of Muons", Columbia University, University of California-Berkeley, United States Department of Energy (through predecessor agency the Atomic Energy Commission), (Feb. 1961).
Pais, A., Weinberg, S., Quigg, C., Riordan, M., Panofsky, W.K.H. & V. Trimble. "100 years of elementary particles", Stanford Linear Accelerator Center United States Department of Energy, Beam Line, vol. 27, issue 1, Spring 1997. (April 1, 1997).

Popular articles
A Designer Universe?, a refutation of attacks on the theories of evolution and cosmology (e.g., those conducted under the rubric of intelligent design) is based on a talk given in April 1999 at the Conference on Cosmic Design of the American Association for the Advancement of Science in Washington, D.C.  This and other works express Weinberg's strongly held position that scientists should be less passive in defending science against anti-science religiosity.
Beautiful Theories, an article reprinted from Dreams of a Final Theory by Steven Weinberg in 1992 which focuses on the nature of beauty in physical theories.
The Crisis of Big Science, May 10, 2012, New York Review of Books. Weinberg places the cancellation of the Superconducting Super Collider in the context of a bigger national and global socio-economic crisis, including a general crisis in funding for science research and the provision of adequate education, healthcare, transportation, and communication infrastructure, and criminal justice and law enforcement.

References

External links

  including the Nobel Lecture, December 8, 1979, "Conceptual Foundations of the Unified Theory of Weak and Electromagnetic Interactions"
 
 
 
 

1933 births
2021 deaths
20th-century atheists
21st-century American physicists
21st-century atheists
American atheism activists
American Nobel laureates
American skeptics
American string theorists
Historians of physics
American Zionists
The Bronx High School of Science alumni
Columbia University alumni
Cornell University alumni
Critics of religions
Fellows of the American Academy of Arts and Sciences
Fellows of the American Physical Society
Foreign Members of the Royal Society
Harvard University staff
Jewish American scientists
Jewish American atheists
Jewish physicists
Members of JASON (advisory group)
Members of the American Philosophical Society
Members of the United States National Academy of Sciences
MIT Center for Theoretical Physics faculty
National Medal of Science laureates
Nobel laureates in Physics
Princeton University alumni
Scientists from New York City
University of California, Berkeley faculty
University of Texas at Austin faculty